Abacavir/dolutegravir/lamivudine, sold under the brand name Triumeq among others, is a fixed-dose combination antiretroviral medication for the treatment of HIV/AIDS. It is a combination of three medications with different and complementary mechanisms of action: abacavir (reverse transcriptase inhibitor), dolutegravir (integrase inhibitor) and lamivudine (nucleoside analog reverse transcriptase inhibitor).

The medication was developed by ViiV Healthcare and was approved for use in the United States and in the European Union in 2014.

Abacavir is a nucleotide reverse transcriptase inhibitor. Specifically, abacavir is a guanosine analogue that interferes with HIV viral RNA-dependent DNA polymerase, ultimately resulting in inhibition of replication of HIV. Dolutegravir inhibits the HIV replication cycle by binding to the integrase active site and inhibiting the strand transfer step of HIV-1 DNA integration. Lamivudine is a cytosine analogue that inhibits HIV reverse transcription by terminating the viral DNA chain.

Medical uses 
Abacavir/dolutegravir/lamivudine is indicated for the treatment of HIV/AIDS in adults and adolescents aged 12 years of age and older who weigh at least .

Adverse effects 
The following adverse reactions were reported in <2% of patients:
 Central nervous system: drowsiness, lethargy, nightmares, sleep disorders, suicidal ideation
 Dermatologic: pruritus
 Endocrine and metabolic: high levels of triglycerides
 Gastrointestinal: abdominal distention, abdominal distress, abdominal pain, lack of appetite, stomach upset, flatulence, gastroesophageal reflux disease, upper abdominal pain, vomiting
 Hepatic: hepatitis
 Neuromuscular and skeletal: joint pain, muscle inflammation
 Kidney: chronic kidney disease
 Miscellaneous: fever

See individual agents as well as other combination products for additional information.

Pregnancy 
Abacavir/dolutegravir/lamivudine should only be used in pregnancy if the potential benefits outweigh the risks.

Breastfeeding 
The US Centers for Disease Control and Prevention (CDC) recommends that HIV-infected mothers do not breastfeed their infants to avoid risking postnatal transmission of HIV. This recommendation is coupled with the potential for serious adverse reactions in nursing infants. Dolutegravir and abacavir were shown to be excreted in the milk of lactating rats. Lamivudine was shown to be excreted in human breast milk.

History

Approval 
The patent was filed on April 28, 2006, and expires on October 5, 2027. It was approved for use in the United States and in the European Union in 2014.

Major label changes 
In August 2015, the Food and Drug Administration (FDA) sent a bulletin regarding label updates for dolutegravir and Triumeq regarding drug-drug information.

Drug interactions was updated to include a statement that in vitro, dolutegravir was not a substrate of OATP1B1 or OATP1B3. Furthermore, information regarding drug interactions with carbamazepine and metformin.

Additionally, less common adverse reactions observed in clinical trials was updated to include suicidal ideation, attempt, behavior, or completion in order to be consistent with dolutegravir label.

In September 2015, the FDA added a boxed warning of hypersensitivity reactions, lactic acidosis, and severe hepatomegaly in abacavir-containing products regarding HLA-B*507 allele.

Boxed warning (9/2015)
 Hypersensitivity reactions
 Lactic acidosis and severe hepatomegaly with steatosis
 Exacerbations of hepatitis B

Dosage and administration
 Dosage recommendation with certain concomitant medications (8/2015)
 Not recommended due to lack of dosage adjustment (9/2015)

Contraindications (9/2015)

Warnings and precautions, hypersensitivity reactions (9/2015)

Society and culture

Economics 

In July 2015, ViiV Healthcare struck a deal with Shanghai-based Desano Pharmaceuticals for a cheaper supply of dolutegravir (Tivicay) with the goal of cutting the cost in China and other developing countries. After approval of dolutegravir (Tivicay) in 2014, it came with a retail cost of $14,000 per year in the United States.

Research

Clinical trials 
Efficacy of abacavir/dolutegravir/lamivudine was demonstrated in antiretroviral treatment-naive participants by SINGLE (ING114467), the randomized, controlled trial and other trials in treatment-naive subjects (see dolutegravir).

In the SINGLE trial, 414 participants received dolutegravir + abacavir/lamivudine once daily and 419 participants received efavirenz/emtricitabine/tenofovir once daily. dolutegravir + abacavir/lamivudine compared to efavirenz/emtricitabine/tenofovir showed a reduction in viral load of HIV-1 RNA <50 copies/mL in 80% of participants compared to 72% of participants, respectively. Furthermore, in participants with baseline plasma viral load of <100,000 and >100,000 copies/mL, dolutegravir + abacavir/lamivudine compared to efavirenz/emtricitabine/tenofovir showed a reduction to <50 copies/mL in 85% and 71% compared to 73% and 72%, respectively.

Post-marketing experience 
In addition to the adverse reactions reported in clinical trials, the following adverse reactions have been reported voluntarily from a population of unknown size. As such, it is not always possible to estimate frequency or establish a causal relationship to drug exposure.

Abacavir and/or Lamivudine
 Digestive System: stomatitis
 Gastrointentional: pancreatitis
 General: weakness
 Blood and Lymphatic Systems: aplastic anemia, anemia, enlarged lymph nodes, enlarged spleen
 Hypersensitivity: sensitization reactions (including anaphylaxis), urticaria
 Metabolism and Nutrition Disorders: hyperprolactinemia
 Musculoskeletal System: muscle weakness, CPK elevation, rhabdomyolysis
 Nervous System: paresthesia, peripheral neuropathy, seizures
 Respiratory System: abnormal breath sounds/wheezing
 Skin: hair loss, erythema multiforme. Suspected Stevens–Johnson syndrome (SJS) and toxic epidermal necrolysis (TEN) have been reported in participants receiving abacavir primarily in combination with medications that are known to be associated with SJS and TEN, respectively.

Amyotrophic lateral sclerosis 
The safety and tolerability of Triumeq was evaluated for amyotrophic lateral sclerosis (ALS) patients as part of the Lighthouse trial, an open-label, phase 2a study, conducted in Australia beginning in late 2016 over 24 weeks. The study premise was human endogenous retroviruses, specifically human endogenous retrovirus K (HERV-K) may be a trigger or cause of ALS. Research has linked HERV-K to ALS based on increased nonspecific reverse transcriptase activity in the cerebrospinal fluid and blood of ALS patients, as well as HERV-K being found in the motor neurons of ALS patients. Triumeq was chosen as all three component drugs have good penetration of the central nervous system, particularly dolutegravir, which has high clearance rates for CNS HIV. The study found a significant decrease in HERV-K DNA in serum among study participants and showed a decrease in the slope of clinical progression based on the Amyotrophic Lateral Sclerosis Functional Rating Scale-Revised (ALSFRS-R) of roughly 30%. The trial has since progressed to Phase 3.

References

External links 
 

Fixed dose combination (antiretroviral)
Hepatotoxins